Public security or public safety is the prevention of and protection from events that could endanger the safety and security of the public from significant danger, injury, or property damage. It is often conducted by a state government to ensure the protection of citizens, persons in their territory, organizations, and institutions against threats to their well-being, survival, and prosperity.

The public safety issues that a municipality, county, regional, or federal jurisdiction may handle include crimes (ranging from misdemeanors to felonies), structure fires, conflagrations, medical emergencies, mass-casualty incidents, disasters, terrorism, and other concerns.

Public safety organizations are organizations that conduct public safety. They generally consist of emergency services and first responders such as law enforcement, fire services, emergency medical services, security forces, and military forces. They are often operated by a government, though some private public safety organizations exist where possible.

Framework 

Organized crime and international terrorism are hardly deterred by geographical, linguistic, or financial barriers. The latter has largely contributed to public security becoming an important political and economic issue, nationally as well as internationally. Politics, public organizations and businesses closely collaborate to guarantee public security and maintain a stable environment for economic prosperity.

Although public security significantly contributes to the attractiveness of a location, the productivity of its people, and hence the overall success of an economy, the sector frequently suffers from low budgets, limited resources, and inadequate information systems. Large events, pandemics, severe accidents, environmental disasters, and terrorist attacks pose additional threats to public security and order.

The police, federal police and border authorities nonetheless need to warrant the security of the country as a fundamental prerequisite for the domestic political ability to act. The quality and scope of potential threats have changed significantly, and the tasks and general framework for the police, federal police and border authorities have changed accordingly.

Public safety organizations

National 
Federal law enforcement agency
Criminal investigation department
Border patrol
Gendarmerie
Ministry or department of interior, justice, or public safety

Regional 
County police
Sheriff or constable's office
State trooper or provincial police

Local 
Police department or marshal
Fire services
Emergency medical services
Local government
Municipal public affairs office

Sub-sectors

Law enforcement 
National or federal police
Regional, state, and local police

Intelligence and information sharing 
Intelligence services
Investigator services
Secret services

Emergency 
Emergency medical services
Fire service
Police
Park ranger
Search and rescue

Justice 
Courts
Judges
Juries
Lawyers and advocates
Forensic
Justice ministry
Prison officers

Interior 
Border and port authorities
Coast guard
Customer services

Organizations

 By nation
 In Australia, Australian Institute of Public Safety, Australian Federal Police
 In Brazil, National Secretariat of Public Safety
 In Canada, Public Safety Canada
 In France, Committee of Public Safety
 In Japan, National Public Safety Commission (Japan)
 In South Korea, Ministry of the Interior and Safety (South Korea)
 In United Kingdom, Department of Health, Social Services and Public Safety (Northern Ireland only)
 In United States, United States Department of Homeland Security, Department of Public Safety
 In Mongolia, State Emergency Commission (Mongolia)
 Formerly Public Security (Czechoslovakia) with Czechoslovakia
 Airport security
 Association of Public-Safety Communications Officials-International
 Civil defense
 Civil defense sirens
 Common Alerting Protocol
 Consumer Product Safety Commission
 Emergency management
 Emergency telephone number
 Firefighting
Neighborhood Watch

 Food safety
 Guardian Angels
 Good safety practice
 National Highway Traffic Safety Administration
 Natural disaster
 No-go area
 Occupational safety and health
 Office of Emergency Management
 Personal protective equipment
 Police
 Public health
 Public safety network
 Risk
 Road traffic safety
 Safety engineering
 SafetyLit

See also 
 Homeland security
 Justice
 Law enforcement
 Societal security

References

External links 

 Murray N. Rothbard: The Public Sector, III: Police, Law, and the Courts aus For a New Liberty: The Libertarian Manifesto

Emergency services
Crime
Law enforcement
Justice
Security
 
Public safety communications